KPBS (channel 15) is a PBS member television station in San Diego, California, United States. Owned by San Diego State University as part of KPBS Public Media, it is a sister station to NPR member KPBS-FM (89.5). The two outlets share studios at the Conrad Prebys Media Complex at Copley Center on Campanile Drive on the SDSU campus. The TV station's transmitter is located on San Miguel Mountain in southwestern San Diego County.

History
In 1960, San Diego State College (now San Diego State University) applied for a license from the Federal Communications Commission (FCC) to operate a non-commercial educational television station to serve San Diego. The station first signed on the air on June 12, 1967, as KEBS-TV. The station was originally a member of National Educational Television (NET) before becoming a member of PBS when it launched on October 6, 1970, at which time the station changed its call letters to KPBS-TV. Despite the calls, which mimic the callsign schemes used by stations owned by ABC, NBC, and CBS in New York City and Los Angeles, it is not an owned-and-operated station (nor is similarly-named WPBS in Watertown, New York), as PBS cannot own or operate any of its member stations or regional member networks due to the service's local and non-profit nature. The KPBS call sign reflects the station's affiliation and programming, but not any special status within PBS.

On January 1, 2011, when Los Angeles' longtime PBS station KCET ended its membership, KPBS began to be carried on cable providers in the Bakersfield market, alongside fellow PBS stations KVCR-DT in San Bernardino and KVPT in Fresno. It is also one of three PBS member stations that serve the Palm Springs market, alongside KVCR-DT and KOCE-TV in Huntington Beach (which succeeded KCET as Los Angeles' primary PBS member station). As with most other PBS members, KPBS carries nationally distributed programs from PBS, American Public Television (APT), and other distributors.

KPBS started broadcasting digital television on November 21, 2001. On June 12, 2009, the station turned off its analog signal over UHF channel 15 in accordance with the federal mandate for transitioning television broadcast from analog to digital. The station's digital signal remained on its pre-transition UHF channel 30. On March 26, 2019 the digital signal has been moved to UHF channel 19 as a result of spectrum reallocation. Through the use of PSIP, digital television receivers display the station's virtual channel as its former UHF analog channel 15.

Programming
A typical lineup on the main KPBS channel includes children's programming from 6 a.m. to 5 p.m. News programs include Nightly Business Report, BBC World News, KPBS Evening Edition, and PBS NewsHour. The evening hours are taken by documentaries, travel videos, episodes of Frontline, and drama series.

The KPBS2 channel offers various news and analytical programs, like Amanpour on PBS, NHK Newsline, DW News, and BBC World News America, as well as the same news programs as on the main channel but several hours apart. This channel also offers multitude of documentary and travel films. Often, a film shown in the morning is repeated in the afternoon the same day.

The KPBS Create channel is dedicated to home improvement, gardening, cooking, and other hobbies and crafts.

The KPBS Kids channel broadcasts children's programming 24 hours a day, in addition to 11 hours of the children's programming on the main channel.

News programming
KPBS produces a nightly half-hour news program on weeknights titled KPBS Evening Edition, a self-contained television newscast that is an extension of the Midday Edition newscast aired by its radio sister. KPBS' news department is editorially independent from the station's management, San Diego State University and corporate underwriters and donors. The station's investigative reports are conducted in collaboration with the nonprofit newsgathering organization Investigative Newsource, which shares a newsroom with KPBS television and radio at the Campinale Drive studios.

The station collaborates on breaking news coverage and shares news video with the local ABC affiliate KGTV (channel 10). In addition, KPBS broadcasts news programs from affiliates and other networks like PBS NewsHour provided by PBS, NHK Newsline and DW News provided by World, as well as BBC World News America provided by BBC America.

Subchannels
The station's digital signal is multiplexed:

The initial lineup consisted of two multiplexed channels: the main high definition channel in 720p and the standard definition channel in 480i, the latter used for DTV simulcast of analog channel 15. In 2006, an SD sub-channel was added, carrying content from Create. That same year, the main HD channel was switched from 720p to 1080i. Later that year, KPBS dropped the simulcast of analog channel 15 and implemented statistical multiplexing.

In 2007, KPBS replaced Create with V-me, a 24/7 Spanish-language public television channel.

By the middle of the 2010s, KPBS experienced budgetary constraints and erosion of viewership. The locally produced current affairs show Full Focus attracted less than one percent of the potential audience. One of the ways to increase viewership was to increase the number of subchannels as other public TV stations had done.

In January 2017, V-me ended its multicast service for public television, transitioning to commercial cable. KPBS, along with many other PBS affiliates, replaced V-me with the PBS Kids multicast channel. KPBS relaunched Create subchannel and added one more subchannel, KPBS2. John Decker, director of programming at KPBS in San Diego, explained that multicasts such as PBS Kids, Create, World, and locally developed programming "give public TV an opportunity to increase value and thus loyalty among viewers" as well as "allow KPBS to expand its universe".

Simultaneously with the 2017 lineup change, KPBS switched its HD format from 1080i to 720p and changed aspect ratio of SD channels from 4:3 to 16:9. Image quality degradation, caused by sharing of available bandwidth over four multiplexed channels, was noticed by viewers.

References

External links
www.kpbs.org/tv - KPBS official website

PBS member stations
Television channels and stations established in 1967
San Diego State University
PBS
1967 establishments in California